Marcin Kolusz (born January 18, 1985) is a professional Polish ice hockey right wing. He is currently a free agent.

Kolusz played junior hockey with Podhale Nowy Targ, and was selected by the Minnesota Wild in the 5th round (157th overall) in the 2003 NHL Entry Draft. He then spent one year in North America with the Vancouver Giants of the Western Hockey League, before returning to Europe, spending several years with teams in both the Czech Republic and Slovakia. Kolusz returned to Poland in 2009, and has played in the PHL since then. He has also played internationally for the Polish national team in several tournaments.

Career statistics

Regular season and playoffs

International

External links

 

1985 births
GKS Tychy (ice hockey) players
HC Havířov players
HC Oceláři Třinec players
HC Prostějov players
HK Poprad players
KH Sanok players
KTH Krynica players
Living people
Minnesota Wild draft picks
People from Limanowa
Podhale Nowy Targ players
Polish ice hockey centres
Vancouver Giants players
GKS Katowice (ice hockey) players
Vaasan Sport players
HK Dukla Michalovce players
Polish expatriate ice hockey people
Polish expatriate sportspeople in Canada
Polish expatriate sportspeople in the Czech Republic
Polish expatriate sportspeople in Finland
Expatriate ice hockey players in the Czech Republic
Expatriate ice hockey players in Canada
Expatriate ice hockey players in Slovakia